Kentish Town F.C. was an English football club affiliated to the London and Football Associations. Kentish Town took their name from an area of the London Borough of Camden called Kentish Town.  The senior team were based at The Middlesex Stadium in the London Borough of Hillingdon.  KTFC were wound up in 2015 following the loss of league status after losing access to their home ground following its purchase by Saracens Rugby Club.

History
Originally the club was founded in 1994 as a youth football club by two parents concerned with the lack of opportunity to play competitive football in the local area. In 1995 the club played its first competitive match in the Camden & Islington Youth Midweek League. The club began senior football by joining the Spartan South Midlands League Division Two in 2003. They were promoted in their first season despite only finishing 10th in a 17-team division.

Grounds
Kentish Town currently play their home games at The Middlesex Stadium, Breakspear Road, Ruislip, HA4 7SB.

The club are currently a nomad club who have had to use various grounds in and around North London.

Season-by-season record since 2003

Managerial history

Honours

Club honours
Spartan South Midlands League
 Division One
 Winners (1):2007–08

Records

FA Cup records
Best performance - 2008-09 Extra Preliminary Round
Replay EP Wellingborough Town 2-0 Kentish Town

FA Vase records
Best performance - 2008-09 Round 2
Round 2 Kentish Town 2-6 Biggleswade Town

Club records
Biggest home victory:
8-2 vs. Brache Sparta on 23 August 2006
Biggest away victory:
6-0 vs. New Bradwell St Peter on 17 November 2007
6-0 vs. Brache Sparta on 26 January 2008
Biggest home defeat:
10–1 vs. Chalfont St Peter on 23 December 2008
Biggest away defeat:
8-2 vs. Harefield United on 11 April 2009
Longest unbeaten run:
9 games from 12 March to 22 April 2008

League records
Best league position: 17th, Spartan South Midlands League Premier Division, 2009–10
Worst league position: 10th, Spartan South Midlands League Division Two, 2003–04

External links
Official website

Football clubs in England
Spartan South Midlands Football League
Sport in the London Borough of Barnet
Sport in the London Borough of Camden
Defunct football clubs in London
1994 establishments in England
Association football clubs established in 1994
Association football clubs disestablished in 2015
2015 disestablishments in England